Hadesina limbaria is a moth of the family Notodontidae first described by William Warren in 1900. It is endemic to the Chocó region of Ecuador and Colombia in north-western South America.

References

Moths described in 1900
Notodontidae of South America